The Tomb of Saadi, commonly known as Saadieh, is a tomb and mausoleum dedicated to the Persian poet Saadi in the Iranian city of Shiraz. Saadi was buried at the end of his life at a Khanqah at the current location. In the 13th century a tomb built for Saadi by Shams al-Din Juvayni, the vizir of Abaqa Khan. In the 17th century, this tomb was destroyed. During the reign of Karim Khan was built a mausoleum of two floors of brick and plaster, flanked by two rooms. The current building was built between 1950 and 1952 to a design by the architect Mohsen Foroughi and is inspired by the Chehel Sotoun with a fusion of old and new architectural elements. Around the tomb on the walls are seven verses of Saadi’s poems.

The new building 
The new building was constructed in Persian style. It includes 8 brown stone pillars at the front of the tomb. The main construct is made of white stones and tiles. The building of the tomb of Saddi Shirazi has a cubic shape from outside but from the inside, it is in the form of an octangle with walls of marble and an azure arch. The tomb of Saadi Shirazi has an area of about 257 square meters. The main building of the tomb includes two terraces that are perpendicular to each other. The tomb of Saadi is located at the angle of these terraces. Over the tomb, there is an arch made of turquoise tiles. The stones of the bases of the construct are black and the pillars and the front part terrace are m of red granite stone. The facade of the tomb is made of travertine stone and the interior is made of marble.

Saadi’s tombstone is located in the middle of an octangular building and its ceiling is adorned with turquoise tiles. In seven sides of the building, there are seven inscriptions whose content is chosen from Saadi’s works including Gulistan, Bustan, Qasa’id (Odes), Badaye (aesthetics) and Tayyebat (Clean words) and is written in Ebrahim Bouzari’s font. The content of the other inscription is by Ali Asghar Hekmat, giving some descriptions about the construction of the tomb.

From the left side, the building is attached to a terrace that has seven rooms leading to the tomb of the poet Shourideh Shirazi. The tomb is located in a room with an inscription on top of its door that introduces the poet. A poem by Shourideh is written on the tiles of the room. Some pieces of the stone inscription upon the doorway of the tomb that belongs to the time of Karim Khan Zand have broken off due to an accident and are being kept inside the tomb. A verse from Saadi is written on the mentioned stone that reads:Oh, God! Humiliate me not by reason of Thy greatness; make me not ashamed by reasons of my sins.

The fish Pond 
This pond lies in the left side of the tomb of Saadi Shirazi. It has an octangular shape and an area of about 30.25 square meters. It is attached to the floor of the tomb through 28 steps. It is said that near his room, Saadi had constructed ponds of marble in which water used to flow. Bathing in this water, especially on Chaharshanbeh Suri (the festival of fire on the last Wednesday of the Persian year), used to be one of the traditions of the people of Shiraz. The tile works in the fish pond are in general Seljuqi style. In the year 1372 SH, these tile works were designed by the tile work master Tirandaz and laid by the Cultural Heritage Organization. Over the fish pond, there is an octangular skylight with two other square skylights on its both sides.

The coin pond 
At the front of the terrace, there is a pond by which people make wishes and throw coins in.

The aqueduct 
10 meters below the tomb of Saadi Shirazi, there is an aqueduct whose water contains sulphurous material and also quicksilver. The water of the aqueduct flows underground and pours into Howz-e Mahi (the fish pond).

Gallery

See also
 History of Persian domes

Notes

Tombs in Iran
Buildings and structures in Shiraz
Tourist attractions in Shiraz